Manitoba Colleges Athletic Conference (MCAC), previously known as the Central Plains Athletic Conference, is an organization of college athletics in southern Manitoba, Canada. 

Manitoba Colleges Athletic Conference sports include men's and women's hockey, soccer, volleyball, and basketball as well as tournament sports such as golf, badminton, indoor soccer, and table tennis.

Current members

External links
 Manitoba Colleges Athletic Conference

College athletics conferences in Canada
Sports leagues in Manitoba